SS Gothic was a passenger-cargo liner launched in December 1947, though not completed until a year later. She became the most famous of the quartet when she was designated a royal yacht from 1952 to 1954.

Construction and commercial service

Gothic was built by Swan Hunter, Wallsend-on-Tyne (yard 1759), the fourth and final of the Corinthic-class liners ordered by the Shaw, Savill & Albion Line in 1946. She was launched on 12 December 1947, completed in December 1948, and departed on her maiden voyage on 23 December 1948, sailing from Liverpool to Sydney.

The quartet joined the much larger  on the UK to New Zealand service.

In 1969 she was sold to China Steel Corp and arrived at Kaohsiung for demolition on 13 August that year.

Royal yacht
In 1952, Gothic was sent to Cammell Laird shipyards to be refitted to become the royal yacht for a tour of Australia and New Zealand. Although the tour was cancelled due to the death of King George VI, considerable work had already been completed and she returned in 1953 to complete the refit, which included a white-painted hull. In 1954 the Queen's visit to Australia occurred and Gothic was used for the visit. The Australian Government film The Queen in Australia 1954 featured the ship in Sydney on arrival and Fremantle on departure three months later. This visit was part of Queen Elizabeth II's coronation world tour in 1954.

References

 

 

Ocean liners
Royal Yachts of the United Kingdom
Cargo liners
1947 ships
Ships built by Swan Hunter